Tephritis hemimelaena is a species of tephritid or fruit flies in the genus Tephritis of the family Tephritidae.

Distribution
Ghana.

References

Tephritinae
Insects described in 1920
Taxa named by Mario Bezzi
Diptera of Africa